The AN/SPY-1 is a United States Navy 3D radar system manufactured by Lockheed Martin. The array is a passive electronically scanned system and a key component of the Aegis Combat System. The system is computer controlled and uses four complementary antennas to provide 360-degree coverage. The upgraded -1B(V) was retrofitted to existing ships from CG-59 up to the last, .

Description
The first production model of the SPY-1 series is SPY-1, which forms the baseline configuration of all subsequent SPY-1 radars. SPY-1A has four antenna arrays in two separate deckhouses, with each antenna array containing 148 modules. Each module contains up to 32 radiating elements and phase shifters, and modules are paired to form transmitting and receiving sub-arrays, which are grouped into 32 transmitting and 68 receiving arrays. Transmitting arrays are driven by eight transmitters, each with four crossed-field amplifiers (CFAs). There are 4,096 total radiators, 4,352 receivers, and 128 auxiliary elements on each antenna array. The power requirement of SPY-1A is four times that of the AN/SPS-48. The AN/UYK-7 computer controls SPY-1.

It was discovered that the false alarm rate was high because the radar would pick up swarms of insects and clutter from mountainous terrain. The solution was to allow the operator to change the sensitivity profile of radar by periodically reducing attenuation, and setting threat and non-threat sectors according to changing environment. The result was more efficient utilization of resources. About 10% of the software totaling thirty thousand lines were rewritten to accommodate the necessary upgrade. In 2003, the U.S. Navy donated a SPY-1A antenna to the National Severe Storms Laboratory in Norman, Oklahoma, making it one of the first stationary phased arrays used in weather forecasting. The Multifunction Phased Array Radar was decommissioned and removed in 2016.

SPY-1B adopts VLSI, resulting in increased performance and reduced size and weight. There are 4,350 radiators with two side lobe cancellation antennae, each with two elements, and the radar uses eleven 16-bit microprocessors. The ability to counter steep diving missiles was improved with more energy at higher elevations or longer pulse.

SPY-1B(V) is a development of earlier SPY-1B with moving target indication capability incorporated in 1997.

It is a variant of the -1B to fit the  using the UYK-43 computer, with the main antenna also used as missile uplinks, thus eliminating the need for separate missile uplinks in earlier models. The UYA-4 display in earlier models is replaced by the UYQ-21 display. Starting with Flight III (DDG-125), the Arleigh Burke class is being equipped with AN/SPY-6(V)1 radar from Raytheon; Flight IIA (DDG-79 to DDG-124) will be retrofitted with the AN/SPA-6(V)4 variant.

SPY-1D(V), the Littoral Warfare Radar, was an upgrade introduced in 1998 with a new track initiation processor for high clutter near-coast operations, where the earlier "blue water" systems were especially weak. The waveform is coded and signal processing is improved. The ability to resist electronic attack was also improved.

SPY-1E SBAR (S-Band Active Array) is the only active phased array model in the SPY-1 series. SPY-1E utilizes commercial off-the-shelf (COTS) subsystems, and a single-faced demonstration unit was built in 2004. The weight of the antenna remains the same, but the weight below the deck is greatly reduced. It was later renamed the AN/SPY-2 and subsequently developed into AN/SPY-4 Volume Search Radar (VSR) for s and s to complement their AN/SPY-3 X-band radar.

SPY-1F FARS (frigate array radar system) is a smaller version of the 1D designed to fit frigates. It is used in Norwegian Fridtjof Nansen-class frigates. The origin of the SPY-1F can be traced back to the FARS proposed to the German Navy in the 1980s. It is not used by the U.S. Navy, although there were proposals to retrofit Freedom-class littoral combat ships.

SPY-1F(V) is a derivative of SPY-1F with improved capability against littoral targets and cruise missiles and better multi-mission capability.

SPY-1K is the smallest version of the radar currently offered, based on the same architecture as the 1D and 1F. It is intended for use on very small vessels such as corvettes, where the SPY-1F would be too large. As of 2007, none were in service, although the radar is incorporated into the design of the yet-unbuilt .

Variants
 AN/SPY-1: Prototypes, .
 AN/SPY-1A: s up to CG-58.
 AN/SPY-1B: Ticonderoga-class cruisers starting at CG-59.  diameter.
 AN/SPY-1B(V): Upgrade for the -1B version, retrofitted to CG-59 and up.
 AN/SPY-1D: Variant of -1B designed for Arleigh Burke-class destroyers, Japanese s and Spanish s (F-101-104).
 AN/SPY-1D(V): Littoral Warfare Radar upgrade for the -1D variant applied to Arleigh Burke-class destroyers DDG 91 onwards, Japanese s and s, South Korean s (KDX-III), Spanish F-105 frigate and the Australian  air warfare destroyers (AWD).
 AN/SPY-1F: Smaller version of the -1D designed to fit frigates. Installed on the Norwegian s.  diameter.
 AN/SPY-1K: Smallest version of the radar offered, intended to fit corvette-sized vessels. None currently in service.

Specifications
The following specifications apply to the SPY-1A/B/D series.

 Size:  octagon
 Weight below deck:
 Range: 
 against sea-skimming missiles
 Targets simultaneously tracked: 200 each array, 800 total
 Band: S-band 3–4 GHz; wavelength –
 PRF: variable
 Scan rate (scan/min): 1 (horizon), 12 (above horizon)
Peak Power: 
Average Power: 
Duty cycle: 1/100 seconds
Antenna Gain: 9,300

Operators

: 
: 
: 
: 
: ,

Air and Missile Defense Radar
In July 2009, Lockheed Martin was one of three companies awarded contracts to study the development of a new Air and Missile Defense Radar (AMDR) to be composed of an S-Band radar, an X-Band radar, and a Radar Suite Controller to defend against evolving anti-ship and ballistic missile threats.

See also
AN/SPY-7
AN/SPY-6
AN/TPY-2
MF-STAR
PAAMS
Type 346 Radar

Notes

References

Further reading

External links

Missile Threat CSIS - AN/SPY-1 Radar
GlobalSecurity.org
Fire Controlman Volume 02-Fire Control Radar Fundamentals (Revised) p32—Table of radars
Fire Controlman Volume 02-Fire Control Radar Fundamentals (Revised) p39—AN/SPY-1 history

Military electronics of the United States
Lockheed Martin
Military radars of the United States
Sea radars
Military equipment introduced in the 1970s